1867 Deiphobus  is a dark Jupiter trojan from the Trojan camp, approximately  in diameter. It was discovered on 3 March 1971, by Argentine astronomers Carlos Cesco and A. G. Samuel at the Leoncito Astronomical Complex in Argentina, and later named after the Trojan prince Deiphobus from Greek mythology. The dark D-type asteroid is one of the largest Jupiter trojans. It is a member of the Ennomos family and has a long rotation period of 58.66 hours.

Orbit and classification 

Deiphobus is a dark Jovian asteroid orbiting in the trailing Trojan camp at Jupiter's  Lagrangian point, 60° behind its orbit in a 1:1 resonance . It is a member of the Ennomos family (009), a small Jovian asteroid family with 30 known members, named after 4709 Ennomos. There only a few Jovian families known to date. The Ennomos family was first identified by Jakub Rozehnal and Miroslav Brož in 2011. However, a different HCM-based analysis assigns Deiphobus to the Jovian background population.

It orbits the Sun at a distance of 4.9–5.4 AU once every 11 years and 7 months (4,241 days; semi-major axis of 5.13 AU). Its orbit has an eccentricity of 0.04 and an inclination of 27° with respect to the ecliptic. The body's observation arc begins with its official discovery observation at Leoncito in March 1971.

Physical characteristics 

Deiphobus is characterized as a dark D-type asteroid in the Tholen, Barucci, Tedesco, as well as in the SDSS-based taxonomy.

Lightcurves 

Several rotational lightcurve have been obtained since 1987, when the first photometric observations of Deiphobus by Linda French at CTIO indicated that the body has longer-than average rotation period of at least 24 hours.(). In February 1994, observations by Stefano Mottola and Anders Erikson, using the ESO 1-metre telescope at La Silla Observatory in Chile, gave a slow rotation period of  hours with a brightness variation of  magnitude.

Since 2015, follow-up observations by Robert Stephens at the Center for Solar System Studies measured 58.62 and 58.699, confirming Mottola's long period, and superseding other reported periods from fragmentary lightcurves.

While not being a slow rotator, Deiphobus has a much longer rotation period than the vast majority of asteroids, which typically rotate between 2 and 20 hours once around their axis. Among all large Jovian asteroids, only 617 Patroclus has a longer period than Deiphobus.

Diameter and albedo 

According to the surveys carried out by the Infrared Astronomical Satellite IRAS, the Japanese Akari satellite, and NASA's Wide-field Infrared Survey Explorer with its subsequent NEOWISE mission, Deiphobus measures between 118.22 and 131.31 kilometers in diameter, and its surface has an albedo between 0.037 and 0.060. The Collaborative Asteroid Lightcurve Link derives an albedo of 0.0396 and a diameter of 122.65 kilometers based on an absolute magnitude of 8.68.

Naming 

This minor planet was named after the Trojan warrior, Deiphobus, son of King Priam (also see 108 Hecuba and 884 Priamus). The official  was published by the Minor Planet Center on 20 February 1976.

Notes

References

External links 
 Long-term evolution of asteroid families among Jovian Trojans, Jakub Rozehnal and Miroslav Brož (2014)
 Asteroid Lightcurve Database (LCDB), query form (info )
 Dictionary of Minor Planet Names, Google books
 Discovery Circumstances: Numbered Minor Planets (1)-(5000) – Minor Planet Center
 
 

001867
001867
Discoveries by Carlos Ulrrico Cesco
Named minor planets
001867
19710303